Sunnyside is a neighborhood in the south east section of Portland, between SE Stark Street and SE Hawthorne Blvd. (north to south) and from SE 28th Ave. to SE 49th Ave. (west to east). The Sunnyside Neighborhood motto is "Proud Past, Bright Future".  Sunnyside has a "strong sense of Portland individuality" with many locally owned coffee shops and businesses.
Sunnyside is bordered by Laurelhurst to the north, Richmond to the south, Buckman to the west, and Mount Tabor to the east.  Because of its Victorian architecture and bohemian culture, Hawthorne/Belmont is often compared to San Francisco's Haight Ashbury district.  Sunnyside has been called Portland's "uncontested champion of eco-consciousness".

Points of interest

Peacock Lane, running north and south between Stark and Belmont, is a street known locally for lavish Christmas decorations and displays.

The Sunnyside Piazza, at the intersection of SE 33rd and Yamhill, includes a huge sunflower painted on the road.  This was one of Portland's first city repair projects.  Residents have gathered to repaint the intersection every Memorial Day weekend since 2000.

The Belmont Firehouse is a historic firehouse that now operates as an educational museum.

The Movie Madness Museum, housed in a movie rental store, contains over 100 pieces of memorabilia from classic movies such as Blade Runner, Citizen Kane, and the Sound of Music.

The Avalon Theatre and nickel arcade is Portland's oldest operating movie theater.

Architecture

Libraries
 The Belmont Library is the Multnomah County Library branch in Sunnyside.
 Little free libraries are common in Sunnyside as well as much of inner Southeast Portland.

Schools
 The Sunnyside Environmental School is a K-8 public school located in the heart of Sunnyside.

See also 

 National Register of Historic Places listings in Southeast Portland, Oregon
 Belmont, Portland, Oregon

References

External links

 Adopted Sunnyside Neighborhood Plan (1999)
 Sunnyside Neighborhood Association
 Sunnyside Street Tree Team
 Belmont Area Business Association
 Southeast Portland Bike/Walk Map
 Belmont Library
 2000 and 2010 Census Profile
 Sunnyside Piazza Facebook Page
 Historic Sunnyside Plat
 33rd and Belmont in 1915
 Sunnyside Neighborhood, Part two: Reaching for Community
Sunnyside Street Tree Inventory Report

 
Neighborhoods in Portland, Oregon
Streetcar suburbs